The 2008 Hockey East Men's Ice Hockey Tournament was played between March 14 and March 22, 2008 at campus locations and at the TD Banknorth Garden in Boston, Massachusetts. By winning the tournament, Boston College was awarded the Lamoriello Trophy and an automatic bid to the 2008 NCAA Division I Men's Ice Hockey Tournament.

Format
The tournament featured three rounds of play. The teams that finish below eighth in the conference are not eligible for tournament play. In the first round, the first and eighth seeds, the second and seventh seeds, the third seed and sixth seeds, and the fourth seed and fifth seeds played a best-of-three with the winner advancing to the semifinals. In the semifinals, the highest and lowest seeds and second highest and second lowest seeds play a single-elimination game, with the winner advancing to the championship game. The tournament champion receives an automatic bid to the 2008 NCAA Division I Men's Ice Hockey Tournament.

Regular season standings
Note: GP = Games played; W = Wins; L = Losses; T = Ties; PTS = Points; GF = Goals For; GA = Goals Against

Bracket

Note: * denotes overtime period(s)

Quarterfinals

(1) New Hampshire vs. (8) Massachusetts

(2) Boston University vs. (7) Massachusetts-Lowell

(3) Vermont vs. (6) Northeastern

(4) Boston College vs. (5) Providence

Semifinals

(1) New Hampshire vs. (4) Boston College

(2) Boston University vs. (3) Vermont

Championship

(3) Vermont vs. (4) Boston College

Tournament awards

All-Tournament Team
F Bobby Butler (New Hampshire)
F Benn Ferriero (Boston College)
F Nathan Gerbe* (Boston College)
D Michael Brennan (Boston College)
D Carl Sneep (Boston College)
G John Muse (Boston College)
* Tournament MVP(s)

References

External links
2008 Hockey East Men's Ice Hockey Tournament

Hockey East Men's Ice Hockey Tournament
Hockey East